The 1995 Stockholm Open was a men's tennis tournament played on indoor hard courts at the Kungliga tennishallen in Stockholm, Sweden. It was the 27th edition of the tournament and was now part of the ATP International Series of the 1995 ATP Tour, having been replaced as an ATP Masters Series venue by Essen. The tournament was held from 6 November through 12 November 1995. Second-seeded Thomas Enqvist won the singles title.

Finals

Singles

 Thomas Enqvist defeated  Arnaud Boetsch, 7–5, 6–4
 It was Enqvist's 5th singles title of the year and 7th of his career.

Doubles

 Jacco Eltingh /  Paul Haarhuis defeated  Grant Connell /  Patrick Galbraith, 3–6, 6–2, 7–6

References

External links
 
 ATP tournament profile
 ITF tournament edition details

 
[[Category:November 1995 sports events in Europe|Stockholm Open]